Fazzi is an Italian surname. Notable people with the surname include:

Nicolò Fazzi (born 1995), Italian footballer
Vito Fazzi (1851–1918), Italian physician

References

Italian-language surnames